Marobela is a village located in the Central District of Botswana. It had 1,672 inhabitants at the 2011 census.

Settlements
Marobela is divided into 3 settlements:
Mafongo Lands, 107 inhabitants
Matapdza, 18 inhabitants
Ntala, 109 inhabitants

See also
 List of cities in Botswana

References

Populated places in Botswana